Paramilitary forces of Pakistan can refer to any of the following:
 Civil Armed Forces
 Punjab Rangers
 Sindh Rangers
 Frontier Corps Khyber Pakhtunkhwa (North)
 Frontier Corps Khyber Pakhtunkhwa (South)
 Frontier Corps Balochistan (North)
 Frontier Corps Balochistan (South)
 Frontier Constabulary
 Pakistan Coast Guards
 Gilgit-Baltistan Scouts
 Pakistan National Guard
 Mujahid Force
 Janbaz Force
 National Cadet Corps (Pakistan) (disbanded)
 Women's Guard (disbanded)
 Pakistan Levies (partially disbanded)
 Balochistan Levies
 Dir Levies
 Gilgit-Baltistan Levies Force
 Khyber Pakhtunkhwa Levies
 Malakand Levies
 Swat Levies

Former paramilitary forces 
 Al-Badr in East Pakistan (now Bangladesh)
 Al-Shams in East Pakistan
 Azad Kashmir Regular Force (now the fully military Azad Kashmir Regiment)
 East Pakistan Rifles (now the Border Guards Bangladesh)
 Federal Security Force, a secret police from 1972-1977
 Gilgit Scouts (now the fully military Northern Light Infantry Regiment but see Gilgit-Baltistan Scouts above)
 Khasadar, disbanded in 2019
 Mehran Force, replaced by the Pakistan Rangers (Sindh)
 Razakar in East Pakistan

See also 
 Law enforcement in Pakistan